This is a chronological list of classical music composers from Italy, whose notability is established by reliable sources in other Wikipedia articles.

Medieval

Renaissance

Baroque

Classical era

Romantic

Modern/Contemporary

 
Italian
Classical composers